Red River Cooperative Limited, branded as Red River Co-op, is a retail cooperative operating in Winnipeg, Manitoba, Canada. 

As of 2022 it operates nine Red River Co-op supermarkets, including five in Winnipeg and one each in Gimli, Stonewall, Lorette, and Selkirk. It also operates gas bars and convenience stores throughout southeastern Manitoba and as far east as Dryden, Ontario.

See also
List of Co-operative Federations
List of Canadian supermarkets

References

External links
 Official Website

Companies based in Winnipeg
Consumers' co-operatives of Canada